Milomir Kovac (Serbian Cyrillic: Миломир Ковач/Milomir Kovač, 21 October 1962 – 24 October 2022) was a Serbian-German veterinary surgeon, equine specialist, columnist, and author of university textbooks.

Biography
From 2007, Kovac worked as the Lecturer for "Equine Biology and Pathology" of the Moscow State Academy of Veterinary Medicine and Biotechnology and as a columnist for the Russian magazine "Horse World”.

Kovac was latterly the head of the veterinary clinic "New Century" (Moscow), a member of the Serbian Royal Academy of Innovative Science  and the chief instructor of Russian nationwide intensive course for veterinarians specialization: "Equine Medicine and Surgery".

In October 2013, Kovac was awarded at the Moscow State Academy of Veterinary Medicine and Biotechnology, the title of professor "honoris causa" for outstanding achievements in the field of equine medicine in the Russian Federation.

In April 2014, Kovac received the most prestigious award in veterinary medicine of the Russian Federation "Golden scalpel" in the nomination "For the introduction of innovative technologies in the veterinary medicine".

In 2017, Kovac, together with the Federal University of Kazan and the University of Nottingham (Great Britain), was the first in the world to successfully apply the gene therapy technology in the treatment of severe damage of equine tendon and ligaments.

From 2007, Kovac was the only full-time available equine surgeon specialist in the Russian Federation. He started the first implementation equine colic surgery in Russia. In the course of ten years, 300 such operations were performed, with the percentage of survival rate of over 82%. Prior to 2007, all horses with intestinal strangulation died in the Russian Federation, because nobody could perform the colic surgery. In addition, Kovac was the first in the Russian Federation, to perform laparoscopic surgery for equine cryptorchidism,  and cryosurgery to remove abdominal and skin tumors. He was the first to use the mesenchymal stem cells  and platelet-rich plasma for the treatment of equine tendon and ligament injury.

In cooperation with Joseph Toth, he first performed a pars plana vitrectomy of horses with equine recurrent uveitis, as well as first performed an evisceration with insertion of an intrascleral prosthesis of horses in the Russian Federation.
.

Kovac wrote several books of the equine medicine and surgery  and is also author of over 100 scientific papers. His monographs "Colic disease of horse"   and "Equine Orthopedic Diseases - Modern methods of diagnosis and treatment"  are the first published university textbooks, in these fields of equine medicine in the Russian-speaking world. As the university textbooks, these books have been approved by Ministry of Education and Science of the Russian Federation.

Kovac died on 24 October 2022, at the age of 60.

References

External links 
 official website |http://kovac.ru
  Veterinary Clinic – New Century
  Magazine  “Horseworld”
  Stem Cell  Labor  in Russia
 Magazine “Vetpharma” 
 Moscow state academy of veterinary medicine and biotechnology named K.I. Skryabin 

1962 births
2022 deaths
Academic staff of the University of Sarajevo
German veterinarians
Bosnia and Herzegovina emigrants to Germany
People from Foča
Serbian scientists
Serbs of Bosnia and Herzegovina